The following list includes notable people who were born or have lived in Park Forest, Illinois. For a similar list organized alphabetically by last name, see the category page People from Park Forest, Illinois.
Sheila McGann

Academics and authors

Acting

Business

Journalism

Music

Politics and law

Sports

References

Park Forest
Park Forest